Alex Lozupone is a New York City–based jazz and rock musician and film director. As a musician, he is a member of Marc Edwards & Slipstream Time Travel, and has played with Percy Jones and Stephen Moses. As a director and cinematographer, he shoots mainly music shows in New York City, and has put up videos for artists such as Pet Bottle Ningen, Weasel Walter, Gato Loco, 24-7 Spyz, and Melvin Van Peebles, as well as readings by Samuel Delany. He has also received airplay on WFMU.

In 2011, he released the first video associating the Occupy Wall Street movement with the Melvin Van Peebles song, Love, That's America. The video spawned several imitators.

In 2012, he recorded and mixed Melvin Van Peebles' first album in 17 years, Nahh… Nahh Mofo. He then shot and edited, with Van Peebles, a video to accompany the album for Lilly Done The Zampoughi Every Time I Pulled Her Coattail.

Also in 2012 he joined Marc Edwards & Slipstream Time Travel, performing at a fundraiser at the Cotton Club.

In 2013 he recorded and performed on two tracks on a benefit album for Donovan Drayton, which also featured Ronny Drayton, Paula Henderson, Jimi Hazel, and Burnt Sugar. He also recorded and played on a release by Marc Edwards called Holographic Projection Holograms, an album which Steve Holtje listed as #12 in his Favorite Jazz albums of 2013. Holtje particularly praised Lozupone's configuration of splitting his guitar signal and routing it signal through a processor and bass amp, creating both a guitar and bass track.

In 2014, he released a CD under the group name "Eighty-Pound Pug", with David Tamura and Paul Feitzinger. Bruce Gallanter of Downtown Music Gallery says of the CD, "Right from that opening salvo, this trio is powerful and impressive. Mr. Lozupone sounds as if he is playing some dark, metalish, heavy guitar with Mr. Tamura's sax also erupting intensely and Feitzinger strong drumming holding things together. Scary, punk/metal/free/jazz improv?!? Lozupoane does a fine job of playing powerful riffs, helping to keep the trio focused into a fire-breathing bohemeth. He uses effects likea wah-wah or distortion to fatten his sound into a more throbbing mass. Torture time? Indeed." In 2015, he released, with poet Steve Dalachinsky, Leave The Door Open; Steve Holtje of Culture Catch said of this album "Dalachinsky's self-deprecating Brooklyn humor and existentialist beat musings, more usually accompanied by free jazz, prove highly compatible with this doomier sound keyed on Lozupone's electronically combined bass and guitar. Really, what better to accompany a 9/11 poem that starts, "I thought it was the end of the world/And then the end of the world happened again"?".

Discography
 2013 – Marc Edwards with Sonos Gravis – Holographic Projection Holograms
 2014 – Marc Edwards – Sakura sakura
 2014 – Pain Hertz with Nick Wolven and Carmine Guida – Sakura
 2014 – Alex Lozupone Project (aka Eighty-Pound Pug) with David Tamura and Paul Feitzinger – Poodle
 2015 - Eighty-pound Pug with David Tamura and Kevin Shea - donetsk donatello
 2015 - Eighty-pound Pug with David Tamura and Keith Abrams - First Meetings
 2015 - Eighty-pound Pug with David Tamura and Elliott Levin - tenoreleven
 2015 - Eighty-pound Pug with Steve Dalachinsky - Leave The Door Open
 2015 - Eighty-pound Pug - When The Flowers Bloom In Baltimore

References

External links

American jazz musicians
American rock musicians
Film directors from New York City
Living people
Jazz musicians from New York (state)
Year of birth missing (living people)